Cemitério de Perus (officially Cemitério Dom Bosco), currently renamed Colina dos Mártires (Hill of Martyrs), is a cemetery located in the northern part of the city of São Paulo, Brazil, on the edge of the homonymous subprefecture, near the border with the city of Caieiras. Created in 1971 by the mayor Paulo Maluf, it is about 254 thousand square meters in length.,

The cemetery is known for burying poor people, for its location and price; it was built to bury the bodies of homeless and unidentified people, currently burying 12 people a day on average. It has forty five thousand graves and has over one hundred and fifty thousand burials in all its length. It also has space for wakes with six rooms and parking, has an ecumenical chapel 

During the period of the military dictatorship (1964-1985), the cemetery was used for the burial of people killed by the regime's security forces. Remains of 1,049 disappeared people were thrown into the cemetery's clandestine mass grave. They remained there until 1990, when the grave was opened and investigated by order of Mayor Luiza Erundina.

In 1993 a memorial in honor of the victims was opened in the cemetery.

References

Military dictatorship in Brazil
Perus
Coordinates on Wikidata